Delta Serpentis, Latinized from δ Serpentis, is a binary star system in the constellation Serpens, in its head (Serpens Caput). The light from the two stars in the system give a combined apparent magnitude of +3.80, which is bright enough to be visible to the naked eye. Based on parallax measurements, it is located at a distance of approximately 230 light years from the Sun. The system is moving closer with a radial velocity of ~42 km/s, and may come to within  in 1.2 million years.

The primary, component A, is a yellow-white F-type subgiant with an apparent magnitude of +4.25. It is classified as a Delta Scuti type variable star and its magnitude varies by 0.04 with a period of 0.1557 days. Its binary companion, component B, is also an F-type subgiant which is slightly dimmer, with a magnitude of +5.2. A and B are separated by four arcseconds in the sky, and perform one orbit around their centre of mass once every 3,200 years.

Naming 

It was a member of indigenous Arabic asterism al-Nasaq al-Yamānī, "the Southern Line" of al-Nasaqān "the Two Lines", along with α Ser (Unukalhai), ε Ser (Ba, Pa), δ Oph (Yed Prior), ε Oph (Yed Posterior), ζ Oph (Han) and γ Oph (Tsung Ching).

According to the catalogue of stars in the Technical Memorandum 33-507 - A Reduced Star Catalog Containing 537 Named Stars, al-Nasaq al-Yamānī or Nasak Yamani were the title for two stars :δ Ser as Nasak Yamani I and ε Ser as Nasak Yamani II (exclude α Ser, δ Oph, ε Oph, ζ Oph and γ Oph)

References

F-type subgiants
4
Delta Scuti variables
Serpens (constellation)
Serpentis, Delta
Durchmusterung objects
Serpentis, 13
138917 8
076276
5788
Nasak Yamani I
A-type subgiants